Godwin Antwi Birago (born 7 June 1988) is a professional footballer who can play at either centre-back or as a central midfielder. Born in Ghana, he is a youth international for Spain.

Club career

Early career 
Antwi was born in Kumasi, Ghana. When he was 14 years old, he moved to Spain and lived there for three years. He initially played street soccer, before he entered the youth setup of Spanish club Real Zaragoza for 1 year. He eventually obtained a Spanish passport.

Liverpool 
At 17 years of age, he was spotted by Paco Herrera, then head scout of Liverpool. He watched Liverpool beat Chelsea home at Anfield in the semi-final of the 2005 UEFA Champions League. The experience of hearing the Anfield crowd left a great impression on him, and he expressed a desire to reach the status of former African Liverpool player, Guinean international striker Titi Camara. He joined Liverpool, who had newly been crowned the UEFA Champions League winners, when Liverpool manager Rafael Benítez offered him a contract in August 2005.

He started his Liverpool career, playing in the reserve team during the 2005–06 season. Due to a striker shortage, he initially played up front. In his usual defending position, he helped Liverpool win the 2006 FA Youth Cup, beating Manchester City in the final.

On 8 November 2006, Antwi was called up by the Under-19 Youth setup of the Spain national team to train with them. The call-up was possible due to his Spanish passport. Despite the Spain Under-19 team call-up, Antwi could freely choose which country to represent at a senior level before he turned 21 years old.

On 10 January 2007, Antwi was named captain of the Liverpool Reserves for the first time, and the 18-year-old led by example at the back against the experienced Neil Shipperley of Sheffield United. On 13 March, it was announced that he had joined Accrington Stanley on a month's loan. He remained at Stanley until the end of the season.

Antwi joined Hartlepool United on a season-long loan for the 2007–08 season on 29 June 2007. He scored his first goal for Hartlepool against Doncaster on 18 August 2007.

In July 2008 he joined Tranmere Rovers on loan until January 2009. He returned to Anfield, only to be loaned out again in February 2009, this time to League One side Hereford United, and made his debut in their 2–0 home win over Leeds United.

Antwi was released by Liverpool FC on 16 June 2009.

Vejle BK 
On 23 December Antwi signed a half-year-long contract with Danish club Vejle BK.

Bodø/Glimt 
After his contract with Vejle expired, Antwi signed a half-year contract with Norwegian First Division side Bodø/Glimt on 30 July 2013. He made his debut in the 2–0 victory against Sandefjord.

Sisaket FC 
Antwi signed for Sisaket of the Thai Premier League on 23 February 2014. He made his debut in the 0–1 loss against Osotspa Saraburi F.C.

On 15 October 2014 Antwi scored his first goal in Thai Premier League in 1–3 loss against Buriram United.

DRB-Hicom FC 
Despite Sisaket FC's offer to extend his contract, Antwi made a decision to sign with a Malaysia Premier League side, DRB-Hicom F.C. He continues to be a very influential figure in the club, providing his team a rock-solid defence and much needed leadership at the back.

Melaka United 
However, after a year and a half playing, DRB-Hicom F.C. announced they will defunct the senior team for financial reason. Released as a free agent, it didn't take too long for Antwi to find a new club following a strong performance in Malaysia Premier League 2016 season. He was immediately signed by Melaka United F.C. following their promotion to Malaysia Super League.

Honours

Club 
Liverpool Youth
 FA Youth Cup: 2005–06
Bodø/Glimt

 Norwegian First Division: 2013

References

External links

Antwi’s Official Hartlepool United F.C. profile
Liverpool FC profile
Vital Hartlepool Profile: Godwin Antwi
Vejle Boldklub Kolding profile: Godwin Antwi

1988 births
Living people
Footballers from Kumasi
Spanish footballers
Spain youth international footballers
Ghanaian footballers
Spanish expatriate footballers
Spanish sportspeople of African descent
Spanish people of Ghanaian descent
Liverpool F.C. players
Accrington Stanley F.C. players
Hartlepool United F.C. players
Tranmere Rovers F.C. players
Hereford United F.C. players
English Football League players
Asante Kotoko S.C. players
Vejle Boldklub players
Vejle Boldklub Kolding players
FK Bodø/Glimt players
Godwin Antwi
Norwegian First Division players
Expatriate footballers in England
Spanish expatriate sportspeople in England
Expatriate men's footballers in Denmark
Expatriate footballers in Norway
Expatriate footballers in Thailand
Association football central defenders
Melaka United F.C. players
Expatriate footballers in Malaysia
Spanish expatriate sportspeople in Denmark
Spanish expatriate sportspeople in Norway
Spanish expatriate sportspeople in Thailand
Spanish expatriate sportspeople in Malaysia